Rama Burshtein is an American-born Israeli filmmaker best known for her 2012 debut feature, Fill the Void.

Early life

Burshtein was born in New York in 1967, and moved to Tel Aviv when she was one year old. She attended the Sam Spiegel Film and Television School in Jerusalem, graduating in 1995.

Burshtein became an Orthodox Jew when she was 25 years old.

Career

Prior to Fill the Void, Burshtein was part of a collective of Orthodox Jewish women film-makers who funded, produced, directed, and wrote films for themselves.

According to Burshtein, it took her 15 years to complete her debut film, Fill the Void, with numerous delays over writing, casting, and editing. It took her a year to find actress Hadas Yaron to play the main role of Shira, and another year in post-production because of insecurities over the editing process.

Fill the Void starred Chayim Sharir, Hadas Yaron, Hila Feldman, Ido Samuel, Irit Sheleg, Razia Israeli, Renana Raz, Yael Tal, and Yiftach Klein. It is the story of a religious Jewish woman who must make a decision about whether or not to marry her late sister's husband.

Fill the Void premiered at the 69th Venice International Film Festival. Lead actress Hadas Yaron won the Volpi Cup for her work.  Burshtein won three Ophir Awards for directing, writing, and producing for her work on the film. The film was picked up for North American distribution by Sony Pictures Classics. It was released in 2013, to great critical acclaim, receiving a score of 81 on Metacritic.

In 2013, Burshtein was invited to direct a short film in celebration of the 70th anniversary of the Venice International Film Festival. Her film, along with those of 69 other directors, was collected in a work entitled Venezia 70 - Future Reloaded, and premiered at the 70th Venice International Film Festival.

Burshtein's second film, The Wedding Plan (Through the Wall in Hebrew), was again set in an Israeli Orthodox Jewish community, about a young woman determined to still get married on the date of her planned wedding after her fiancé leaves her. The film stars Noa Koler, who won the best actress award at the 2016 Haifa International Film Festival.

Family life
She has three sons and a daughter with her husband, Aharon Burshtein.

Filmography
 Fill the Void (2012)
 Venezia 70 - Future Reloaded (2013)
 The Wedding Plan (Through the Wall) (2016)

References

Further reading

External links

1961 births
Living people
American emigrants to Israel
American Orthodox Jews
American women film directors
Israeli Orthodox Jews
Israeli female screenwriters
Israeli women film directors
Jewish American screenwriters
Film directors from New York City
People from Tel Aviv
Screenwriters from New York (state)
21st-century American Jews
21st-century American women